Moi High School-Kabarak is a private mixed-boarding school started in 1979 to offer secondary education to Kenyan students. It was founded by Kenya's second president, Daniel Arap Moi.

The school is located 20 km from Nakuru town, in Kenya's Rift Valley Province. It shares the same compound with Kabarak University and Kabarak Primary.

The school is reputed for its Christian background and good performance in the Kenya Certificate of Secondary Education exams. It is regarded as the top mixed school in the country. The school motto is "On Earth We Rise."

The current principal is Mrs Elisheba Cheruiyot having taken over from  Prof. Henry Kiptiony Kiplagat in May 2015.  Prof. Henry Kiplagat had been principal for 14 years. 
Past principals were: Dr. Edward Sambili, Mr C.N. Lagat, Mr. Grimble, Mr. Joseph Arap Kimetto.

A number of former and current teachers have also gained national acclaim including renown thespian (the late) Barnabas Kasigwa, sports administrator Rowlands Omondi, Mathematics guru Samuel Okumu among others.

History
Moi High School-Kabarak was founded in 1979 by Daniel Arap Moi on his expansive Kabarak farm.

Until recently one of 17 national schools, Moi High School – Kabarak is now a private school funded by tuition revenue, private donations and endowment income.

The school is consistently ranked among Kenya's top-performing schools in each year's national examination results. In the 2010 examination results the school was ranked 6th overall having produced the country's top student. Seven of its students featured among the top 100 candidates nationally. The class of 2011 performed even better registering a mean score of 10.99 breaking the previous record set by the 2010 class of 10.38. Just as in the previous years it was the best private school nationally.

The class of 2014, recorded a mean score of 11.358, having had 134 As, 114 A− (minus), 17 B+, 8 B and 1 B−.==Academics==/>

Many of the school's former students have gone on to gain admission to Ivy League universities in the United States. A high percentage of the school's students qualify to be admitted to the country's public universities.

Admission
The school attracts students with the highest academic performance. The Kenya Certificate of Primary Education (KCPE) average test score for Kabarak admission 385 or higher. Due to the high number of applicants -over 1500- admission to the school is very competitive. Owing to the school's high fees many of the children admitted come from well-to-do backgrounds though orphans and nomadic youth are supported by the school's patron, former Kenyan president Daniel arap Moi.
In the year 2012 it was the first Moi High School. Only 150 will be admitted above 400
and 50 above 385.

Curriculum
In the first year at the school, a student has to take the following compulsory subjects – Mathematics, Languages (English and Kiswahili), Sciences (Biology, Chemistry and Physics), Geography, History and Christian Religious Education. On top of this, the student also has to choose one of the following optional subjects – Agriculture, Business Studies, French, Computer Studies, German or Music. Upon entering form two, the student can take a minimum of 7 subjects to be examined in the K.C.S.E as per the Kenya National Examinations Council (K.N.E.C) guidelines. Most of the students, however, take 8 subjects.

Campus
The school boasts a large, bright dining hall and assembly building, faculty housing, a computer center, swimming pool and a several-storied library with large plate glass windows.

Houses
The school has 4 houses:

Athi
Mara
Nzoia
Tana
The houses are named after Kenya's famous rivers.

Alumni

 Hon. Nixon Kiprotich Korir - Member of Parliament
 Moses Lessonet - Politician
 Dr. Miguna Miguna - Kenyan author, politician, columnist, and attorney

References 

Moi High School Kabarak | Kenya Schools Web Directory

High schools and secondary schools in Kenya
Education in Rift Valley Province
Private schools in Kenya
1979 establishments in Kenya
Educational institutions established in 1979